Clean House New York is an American reality television series on the Style Network. The series premiered on October 17, 2011 and is a spin-off of Clean House. Clean House New York follows New York designers and former HGTV Design Star competitors Nina Ferrer and Michael Moeller, along with their work crew, as they help families across the city clean up their homes.

Episodes

Season 1 (2011)

References

2010s American reality television series
2011 American television series debuts
2011 American television series endings
English-language television shows
Style Network original programming
American television spin-offs
Reality television spin-offs